Werner Scharff may also refer to:
Werner Scharff, a Jewish-German resistance activist
Werner G. Scharff, an American arts patron and fashion designer